Science & Diplomacy is a quarterly magazine published by the Center for Science Diplomacy of the American Association for the Advancement of Science (AAAS).  The publication includes articles, short comments (perspectives), and letters on issues in the field of science diplomacy, diplomacy about scientific issues.

The magazine is published in print and online; the online edition is open access and available without charge on the internet. The articles are reviewed by the magazine's editorial staff and external reviewers, but not formally peer-reviewed.

The magazine's articles have been mentioned and cited in Scientific American, CNN, Pakistan Defence, the American Security Project blog, SciDevNet, and Al-Monitor. The Embassy of France, Washington, D.C., the Chinese Ministry of Science, The Austrian Embassy in Washington, DC, and the American Physical Society have also posted information about the journal.

Leadership

The chair of the magazine's advisory board is Norman P. Neureiter; he discussed the magazine on the Kojo Nnamdi Show on June 25, 2012. Vaughan Turekian, who has written about the subject in Foreign Policy and Science, served as the editor-in-chief from the journal's launch in 2012 to 2015. In an editorial in the September 2015 issue, Turekian noted that William Colglazier would succeed him.

Other advisory board members include:

 Peter Agre, M.D., Professor, Johns Hopkins Bloomberg School of Public Health
 David Clary, F.R.S., Professor of Physical and Theoretical Chemistry and President of Magdalen College, Oxford
 Steven Clemons, Editor at Large, The Atlantic and National Journal
 Paula Dobriansky, Ph.D., Senior Fellow, Harvard Kennedy School of Government
 Esther Dyson, chairman, EdVenture
 Sumaya bint El Hassan, President, Jordan's Royal Scientific Society; chairman, Princess Sumaya University for Technology
 Richard N. Foster, Ph.D., Senior Faculty Fellow, Yale School of Management
 David A. Hamburg, M.D., Visiting Scholar, AAAS
 Mohamed H.A. Hassan, Co-chair, InterAcademy Panel (IAP)
 Kenneth H. Keller, Ph.D., Professor and Director, Johns Hopkins School of Advanced International Studies, Bologna, Italy

History
The first issue was published in March 2012 to "promote interaction between the communities of scientific research and foreign policy."

Notable authors

 Russ Carnahan, former U.S. congressman
 Alice Gast, Lehigh University president 
 Robert Hormats, U.S. Under Secretary of State 
 Dick Lugar, former U.S. senator 
 Naledi Pandor, former South African Minister of Science and Technology
 Harold E. Varmus, Nobel Prize-winning scientist, Director of the National Cancer Institute
 David Evans Shaw, treasurer of the American Association for the Advancement of Science
 Rush D. Holt, Jr., chief executive officer of the American Association for the Advancement of Science and executive publisher of the Science family of journals

References

External links
Official website

American Association for the Advancement of Science
Quarterly magazines published in the United States
Science and technology magazines published in the United States
International relations journals
Magazines established in 2012
Magazines published in Pennsylvania
Science diplomacy